Robertas Giedraitis (born August 29, 1970) is a Lithuanian basketball coach and former player. He is currently the assistant coach for Šiauliai of the Lithuanian Basketball League (LKL). He is also a head coach of BC Delikatesas. Robertas Giedraitis played his whole career with Šiauliai. He is currently the player with the most steals and the most assists made in Lithuanian Basketball League's history.

Career
Before the 2005 season's start, Giedraitis retired as a player and became the assistant coach in Šiauliai. After 2006–07 season, Giedraitis took over as head coach of Šiauliai. On 8 July 2010, Robertas Giedraitis became the head coach of Juventus Utena. On 25 July 2011, Robertas Giedraitis renewed his contract with Juventus basketball team for another year. He left Juventus in the summer of 2012. In 2013, he briefly served as the head coach of Lietkabelis Panevėžys.

Personal life
Giedraitis' son Rokas is also a professional basketball player.

References

External links
 Robertas Giedraitis Basketnews.lt profile (Lithuanian)

1970 births
Living people
BC Šiauliai players
Lithuanian basketball coaches
Lithuanian men's basketball players
Point guards
Basketball players from Kaunas